Eucalyptus quaerenda is a species of mallee that is endemic to the southwest of Western Australia. It is an often rounded mallee with foliage reaching the ground and has smooth bark, linear adult leaves, flower buds in groups of seven, creamy white flowers and shallow, cup-shaped to flattened spherical fruit.

Description
It often has a rounded shape with foliage reaching to the ground. Flowering has been observed in September and the flowers are creamy white.

Taxonomy
This mallee was first formally described in 1992 by Lawrie Johnson and Ken Hill from a specimen collected near Lake Chinocup in 1986. They gave it the name Eucalyptus angustissima subsp. quaerenda and published the description in the journal Telopea. In 2004, Margaret Mary Byrne raised the subspecies to species status as E. quaerenda in the journal Nuytsia and the change has been accepted by the Australian Plant Census.

Distribution and habitat
This mallee is usually found on sandhills and flats and occurs near Lake Chinocup, Lake Altham, Lake King and the upper reaches of the Phillips River in the Esperance Plains, Jarrah Forest and Mallee biogeographic regions.

Conservation status
This eucalypt is only known from fewer than five populations and it is classified as "Priority Three" by the Western Australian Government Department of Parks and Wildlife, meaning that it is poorly known and known from only a few locations but is not under imminent threat.

See also
List of Eucalyptus species

References

Eucalypts of Western Australia
quaerenda
Myrtales of Australia
Plants described in 1992
Mallees (habit)
Category:Taxa named by Lawrence Alexander Sidney Johnson